is the oldest tea house in the world, founded in 1160 in Uji city, Kyoto Prefecture, Japan.
It is also the 13th oldest company in Japan, and the 30th oldest in the world, appearing on the List of oldest companies. Located across from Uji Station on the Keihan Uji line, just east of Uji Bridge (originally constructed in 646), successive generations of Tsuen owners provided tea to travelers as "bridge guardians." The shop is the subject of a Kyōgen farce called "Tsuen" and also appears in Eiji Yoshikawa's epic novel Musashi. Today it is operated by the 24th generation of the Tsuen family.

History
The founder of Tsuen was Furukawa Unai, a samurai vassal of Minamoto no Yorimasa. After retiring in his later years, Furukawa adopted the last character of his master's name (政 Masa), and called himself Tsuen Masahisa (通圓政久). He became a monk and took up residence at the east end of Uji Bridge. His descendants carried on the Tsuen surname, serving as guardians of Uji Bridge, by praying for the durability of the bridge as well as the safety and health of the people who used it. As part of this role, they also served tea to travelers. Various historical figures have been recorded as having tea at Tsuen, including the shoguns Ashikaga Yoshimasa, Toyotomi Hideyoshi, and Tokugawa Ieyasu.

Building
The current building incorporates the remains of a merchant residence built in 1672. Viewed from the front, it has overhanging eaves with a wide frontage and few support pillars. This method of construction is from the early Edo period, and makes it easy for people to come and go from the shop. Inside the entrance there is a display of ceramic tea jars that are several hundred years old, along with a small wooden statue of the Tsuen founder presented by Ikkyū Oshō. A wooden well bucket reputed to have been made by Sen no Rikyū can also be seen.

Main products 
Today the shop sells tea products including the following:
 matcha - ground green tea
 gyokuro - shaded green tea
 sencha - whole tea leaves infused in hot water
 karigane - contains also twigs of the tea tree
 hōjicha - roasted green tea
 genmaicha - mixed low - level green tea and roasted brown rice.

See also
 Japanese tea ceremony
 List of oldest companies

References

External links 
Company website

Tea brands in Japan
Japanese tea
1160s establishments in Japan
Companies based in Kyoto Prefecture
Companies established in the 9th century